Stockerau Airport is a private use airport located  northwest of Stockerau, Lower Austria, Austria.

The airport is the base of the annual CSLI Air Day for the handicapped

See also
List of airports in Austria

References

External links 
 Airport record for Stockerau Airport at Landings.com

Airports in Lower Austria